Donald James Harreld is a former professor of history with a dual appointment in European studies at Brigham Young University (BYU).

Harreld specializes in the early modern history of the Netherlands. He was also the executive director of the Sixteenth Century Society and Conference from 2008–2018. Harreld teaches a course for The Teaching Company on economic history. Herreld holds undergraduate and masters degrees and a Ph.D. from the University of Minnesota.

Publications
 "Atlantic Sugar and Atwerper's Trade with Germany in the Sixteenth Century" in Journal of Early Modern History Vol. 7 (2003) no. 1-2, p. 148–63.
 "Trading Places: The Public and Private Spaces of Merchants in Sixteenth-Century Antwerp" in Journal of Urban History Vol. 29 (2003), issue 6, p. 657–69.
 High Germans in the Low Countries: German Merchants and Commerce in Golden Age Antwerp. (Leiden: Brill Publishers, 2004).
 "'How Great the Enterprise, How Glorious the Deed': Seventeenth Century Dutch Circumnavigation as Useful Myths" in Laura Cruz and Willem Frijhoff, ed., Myth in History, History in Myths.

Sources

Further reading
 The American Historical Review article on Harreld's book

External links
 FHSS faculty page
 
 Sixteenth Century Society and Conference web page

Brigham Young University faculty
Wright State University faculty
University of Minnesota alumni
Living people
Year of birth missing (living people)
Place of birth missing (living people)
American historians